Ben Lamm is an American serial entrepreneur best known for partnering with George Church on the idea for de-extinction and founding a venture capital-backed startup known as Colossal to support Church's work in the development of genetic engineering and reproductive technology.

History 
In 2019, Lamm used $15 million in seed funding to apply genetic technology such as "clustered regularly interspaced short palindromic repeats" (CRISPR) for Colossal's work on conservation biology. At its launch in 2021, he received media attention for claiming that Colossal would "bring back the wooly mammoth" within the next decade. Lamm secured investments from public figures such as Paris Hilton, Charles Hoskinson, and Thomas Tull and has raised more than $75 million as of March 2022. During the 2022 South by Southwest festival, Lamm was on a panel moderated by Richard Garriott that made the case for de-extinction.

Lamm founded his first company when he was a senior at Baylor University. He sold ventures such as Chaotic Moon Studios, a mobile app company, Conversable, a SaaS conversational bot technology, and Hypergiant Industries, a machine-learning artificial intelligence, for undisclosed sums upon each company's acquisition.

References 

1981 births
Living people
American businesspeople
Baylor University alumni